is a Japanese footballer currently playing as a forward for Shonan Bellmare.

Career statistics

Club
.

Notes

References

2003 births
Living people
Association football people from Osaka Prefecture
Japanese footballers
Association football forwards
J1 League players
Shonan Bellmare players